Tobyn Scott Horton (born 7 October 1986) is a British former professional road racing cyclist from Guernsey. Originally a Mountain bike specialist as a child he later switched to road racing; he was successful at Island Games and British Domestic levels, also competing in the Commonwealth Games representing Guernsey and the Tour Series, in which he took wins for a number of professional teams.

Major results

2008
 8th East Midlands International CiCLE Classic
2009
 10th East Midlands International CiCLE Classic
2010
 5th Tour of the Reservoir
 5th Ronde van Midden-Nederland
 10th Ronde Pévéloise
2011
 Island Games
1st  Criterium
4th Time trial
8th Road race
 8th London Nocturne
2012
 6th London Nocturne
 8th Ster van Zwolle
2013
 Island Games
1st  Road race
1st  Criterium
4th Time trial
2014
 1st London Nocturne
 4th Beaumont Trophy
2015
 5th Arno Wallaard Memorial
 8th London Nocturne
2016
 8th London–Surrey Classic
2018
 7th Road race, Commonwealth Games
 10th Rutland–Melton CiCLE Classic

References

External links

1986 births
People educated at Elizabeth College, Guernsey
Living people
Guernsey male cyclists
Guernsey people
Cyclists at the 2018 Commonwealth Games
Commonwealth Games competitors for Guernsey